Crambus hemileucalis is a moth in the family Crambidae. It was described by George Hampson in 1896. It is found in India.

References

Crambini
Moths described in 1896
Moths of Asia